This is a round-up of the 1992 Sligo Senior Football Championship. Shamrock Gaels won their second title in three years, and last to date, after defeating St. Patrick's Dromard in the final, in their last final appearance to date. The Tireragh men would be relegated from Division 1 this year, along with Enniscrone, but both remained in the Championship for 1993. The first round tie between Curry and Enniscrone required two replays and one period of extra-time before Curry eventually emerged by a single point.

First round

Quarter finals

Semi-finals

Sligo Senior Football Championship Final

References

 Sligo Champion (July–September 1992)

Sligo Senior Football Championship
Sligo Senior Football Championship